This is a list of films which have placed number one at the weekend box office in the United Kingdom during 2009.

Films

Notes

References

See also
British films of 2009
List of number-one DVDs of 2009 (UK)

External links
UK Box Office at Digital Spy
UK Box Office at the Internet Movie Database
UK Box Office Archive at the Internet Movie Database
UK Box Office at Virgin Media

2009
United Kingdom
2009 in British cinema